Adel Karam (born 20 August 1972) is a Lebanese actor, comedian and TV presenter.

Career
Karam started his acting career with the comedy show "S.L.CHI" at MTV Lebanon in 1990s, which later became a film, S.L.Film, in 2000. He later starred in comedy shows such as: "La Youmal" at Future TV and "Mafi Metlo" at MTV Lebanon.

He also acted in films and TV series such as: Caramel, Where Do We Go Now?, The Insult, Dollar, and Perfect Strangers. In addition, he hosted talk shows: Hayda Haki (2014–2018) and its spiritual successor Beit El Kell.

Personal life
Karam married Rita Hanna from 2013 to 2014, with whom he had his son Charbel.

References

External links

1972 births
Living people
People from Beirut
Lebanese Maronites
Lebanese actors
Lebanese comedians